Lat Phrao Road is one main road in Bangkok, Thailand.  Despite its name the road does not run through the nearby Lat Phrao District. It begins at Phahonyothin Road, at the corners of the Lat Phrao Square, CentralPlaza Ladprao, and Union Mall in Chatuchak District, passes through Huai Khwang and Wang Thonglang Districts, and ends in Bang Kapi District. The road is serviced by two MRT stations: Phahon Yothin and Lat Phrao. 

This road was formerly known as "Bangkok-Bang Kapi Road" (ถนนกรุงเทพ-บางกะปิ) that runs through the area known as "Thung Bang Kapi" (ทุ่งบางกะปิ), a vast field on the northeast side away from the downtown about 16 km (9.94 mi), most of the fields are immense and some parts are the jungles, as well as the Khlong Saen Saep that was canalized during the reign of King Rama III flows through. 

It was built in 1945, at the end of World War II. At that time it was just a dirt road that intersects with the Sam Yaek Saphan Khlong Saen Saep three-way junction and became a settlement for the various people. Which is the reason that this area has developed in order until now.

Chok Chai 4 Road, or familiarly known as Soi Chok Chai 4 considered to be the most lively and alive quarter of this road. It is a Soi Lat Phrao 53, a large community area with day and night markets, convenience stores, residences, police station and many more, as well as being able to link to other main roads such as Prasert Manukitch,  Pradit Manutham, and Lat Phrao Wang Hin etc.

References

Streets in Bangkok